John Scott (fl. 1572), was an English politician.

He was a Member (MP) of the Parliament of England for Ripon in 1572.

References

Year of birth missing
Year of death missing
English MPs 1572–1583